Hyalornis docta is a moth of the family Geometridae described by William Schaus and W. G. Clements in 1893. It is found in Cameroon, Nigeria, Gabon and Sierra Leone.

References

External links
 - with images

Ennominae
Insects of Cameroon
Insects of West Africa
Fauna of Gabon
Moths of Africa